Astrothelium megeustomurale is a species of corticolous (bark-dwelling) lichen in the family Trypetheliaceae. Found in Brazil, it was formally described as a new species in 2017 by Marcela Eugenia da Silva Cáceres and André Aptroot. The type specimen was collected by the authors along a trail near a field station in the Adolfo Ducke Forest Reserve (Manaus); here it was found growing on tree bark in old-growth rainforest. The lichen has a dull olive-greenish thallus lacking a prothallus, with spherical to pear-shaped ascomata that are either immersed in or on top of the thallus surface, typically arranged in groups of 5 to 15. The pseudostromata (a stroma in which fungal cells and remnants of host tissue are mixed) contain lichexanthone, a secondary chemical. The ascospores number four per ascus, are muriform (divided in regular chambers), and measure 95–120 by 30–33 μm. The species epithet refers to the large ascospores (meg-), the resemblance to A. eustomum (-eusto-), and the muriform ascospores (-murale).

References

megeustomurale
Lichen species
Lichens described in 2017
Lichens of North Brazil
Taxa named by André Aptroot
Taxa named by Marcela Cáceres